Urszula Kielan–Lipiec (born 10 October 1960 in Otwock) is a retired high jumper from Poland. She won four medals at the European Indoor Championships as well as an Olympic silver medal in 1980.

Competition record

References

External links
 

1960 births
Living people
Polish female high jumpers
Athletes (track and field) at the 1980 Summer Olympics
Olympic athletes of Poland
People from Otwock
Sportspeople from Masovian Voivodeship
Olympic silver medalists for Poland
Olympic silver medalists in athletics (track and field)
Medalists at the 1980 Summer Olympics